The Gray-Jewett House is a historic home located at 80 Florida Avenue in Amsterdam, Montgomery County, New York.  It was built in 1890 and is a -story, brick, transitional Queen Anne / Colonial Revival–style residence on a limestone foundation.  Also on the property is a carriage house / garage and ice house.

It was added to the National Register of Historic Places in 2005.

References

External links

Houses on the National Register of Historic Places in New York (state)
Houses completed in 1890
Houses in Montgomery County, New York
National Register of Historic Places in Montgomery County, New York